Sonam Chuki (born 7 April 1963), is a former Bhutanese archer who internationally represented Bhutan.

Chuki competed for Bhutan at the 1984 Summer Olympics held in Los Angeles in the individual event where she finished 43rd.

References

External links
 

1963 births
Living people
Olympic archers of Bhutan
Archers at the 1984 Summer Olympics
Bhutanese female archers